Eissa Nagri or Issa Nagri or Essa Nagri or Isa Nagri  is a neighborhood in the Karachi East district of Karachi, Pakistan. It was previously administered as part of the Gulshan Town borough, which was disbanded in 2011. Eissa or Issa or Isa is the Arabic name for Jesus.

The colony started in 1962 when 85 Christian families migrated from Punjab in search of jobs. There is large Christian population in this neighborhood of Karachi. The original Eissa nagri is mainly a Christian area. The biggest churches are the Roman Catholic Church, United Presbyterian Church, Seventh Day Adventist Church, and the Philadelphia Pentecostal Church.
Eissa Nagri literally means City of Jesus. Eissa Nagri is situated along Sir Shah Suleiman Road in Gulshan Town.

There are several ethnic groups in Gulshan Town including Muhajirs, Sindhis, Punjabis, Kashmiris, Seraikis, Pakhtuns, Balochis, Memons, etc. 10% of the population is Muslim and 90% is Christian. The locality has a Catholic church and missionary schools in this area. The population of Eissa nagri is estimated to be over 40 thousand.

References

External links 
 Karachi Website.

Neighbourhoods of Karachi
Gulshan Town
Christian communities of Pakistan